Adolphus Cambridge, 1st Marquess of Cambridge,  (Adolphus Charles Alexander Albert Edward George Philip Louis Ladislaus; 13 August 1868 – 24 October 1927), born Prince Adolphus of Teck and later the Duke of Teck, was a relative of the British Royal Family, a great-grandson of King George III and younger brother of Queen Mary, the wife of King George V. In 1900, he succeeded his father as Duke of Teck in the Kingdom of Württemberg. He relinquished his German titles in 1917 to become Marquess of Cambridge.

Early life
Prince Adolphus of Teck was born on 13 August 1868 at Kensington Palace, London. His father was Prince Francis, Duke of Teck, the eldest son of Duke Alexander of Württemberg and Countess Claudine Rhédey von Kis-Rhéde (created the Countess von Hohenstein). His mother was the Duchess of Teck (formerly Princess Mary Adelaide of Cambridge), the youngest daughter of Prince Adolphus, Duke of Cambridge, and Princess Augusta of Hesse-Kassel, granddaughter of King George III. Adolphus was styled His Serene Highness Prince Adolphus of Teck at birth. With a string of nine Christian names, among his immediate family he was always known as "Dolly", a pet form of 'Adolphus'. He was educated at Wellington College in Berkshire.

Early military career
Prince Adolphus was a cavalry officer, following in the footsteps of his father, both of his grandfathers, and his maternal uncle. He received his education at Wellington College, before entering the Royal Military College, Sandhurst. At the age of 19, in April 1888, he was commissioned into the British Army as a second lieutenant in the 17th Lancers, the regiment of his maternal uncle, the Duke of Cambridge, who was the commander-in-chief of the British Army from 1856 to 1895. He was promoted lieutenant in January 1893, and transferred to the 1st Life Guards as a captain in June 1895.

Marriage
On 12 December 1894, at Eaton Hall, he married Lady Margaret Evelyn Grosvenor (9 April 1873 – 27 March 1929), the daughter of the 1st Duke of Westminster. The couple had 4 children:

Prince George of Teck, later 2nd Marquess of Cambridge (11 October 1895 – 16 April 1981); married 1923 Dorothy Hastings (18 May 1899 – 1 April 1988).
Princess Mary of Teck, later Lady Mary Cambridge (12 June 1897 – 23 June 1987); married 1923 the 10th Duke of Beaufort (4 April 1900 – 4 February 1984).
Princess Helena of Teck, later Lady Helena Cambridge (23 October 1899 – 22 December 1969); married 1919 Colonel John Evelyn Gibbs (22 December 1879 – 11 October 1932).
Prince Frederick of Teck, later Lord Frederick Cambridge (23 September 1907 – 15 May 1940).

Duke of Teck and later military career
In January 1900, Adolphus succeeded his father as Duke of Teck. The new Duke served with his regiment during the Boer War 1899–1900, for which he was promoted Brevet major in November 1900. He was later a transport officer in the Household Cavalry. In February 1904, he was promoted to the temporary rank of lieutenant-colonel and appointed a temporary military attaché at the British embassy in Vienna. His appointment as military attaché was confirmed in April 1906, and he received a staff posting the same month. He was promoted to the substantive rank of major in December 1906, and was raised to brevet lieutenant-colonel in November 1910.

With an Order in Council dated 9 June 1911, his brother-in-law King George V, as a gift to mark his own Coronation, granted his cousin the style His Highness, which echoed the gift of the King's grandmother, Queen Victoria, to the Duke's father. The same year he was made a Knight Grand Cross of the Order of the Bath (GCB). From other nations he received the grand cross of the Order of the Red Eagle of Prussia and the Order of the Star of Romania.

He was appointed Honorary Colonel of the 8th Battalion, London Regiment, known as the Post Office Rifles in 1912, relinquishing the position in 1923.

From 1914 to his death he was Governor and Constable of Windsor Castle.

With the outbreak of the First World War, he returned to active duty, joining his regiment, 1st Life Guards (possibly at Jabeeke Belgium) on 9 October 1914, returning to base (sick) on 19 October 1914. He first served as assistant military secretary at the War Office, and from December 1915 as military secretary to the commander-in-chief of the British Expeditionary Forces (BEF) in France, Sir Douglas Haig, with the temporary rank of brigadier general. He received from allied nations the Belgian Order of Leopold (Grand Cordon) and Croix de guerre, as well as the French Legion of Honour (Grand Officer).

Following ill-health he was placed on half-pay in July 1916, and retired pay in 1919.

Marquess of Cambridge
During the First World War, anti-German sentiment in the United Kingdom led Teck's brother-in-law, King George V, to change the name of the Royal House from the Germanic House of Saxe-Coburg-Gotha to the more English-sounding House of Windsor. The King also renounced all his Germanic titles for himself and all members of the British Royal Family who were British subjects.

In response to this, Teck renounced, through a Royal Warrant from the King, dated 14 July 1917, his title of Duke of Teck in the Kingdom of Württemberg and the style His Highness. Adolphus, along with his brother, Prince Alexander of Teck, adopted the name Cambridge, after their grandfather, Prince Adolphus, Duke of Cambridge.

He was subsequently created Marquess of Cambridge, Earl of Eltham, and Viscount Northallerton all in the Peerage of the United Kingdom. His elder son took the title Earl of Eltham as a courtesy title. His younger children became Lord/Lady (Christian Name) Cambridge.

Vera Bate Lombardi, Coco Chanel's muse and PR representative, was rumoured to be Adolphus' illegitimate daughter. Hal Vaughan, in his 2012 biography of Coco Chanel ('Sleeping with the Enemy: Coco Chanel's Secret War', p. 42), describes Vera Bate Lombardi as a 'cousin and childhood friend' of Edward, Prince of Wales.

Lord Cambridge made his home in Shropshire after World War I at Shotton Hall, Harmer Hill, near Shrewsbury. He was active in social life in the county, of which he became a Justice of the Peace and Deputy Lieutenant in 1923, and Treasurer of the Royal Salop Infirmary at Shrewsbury in 1925. He hosted visits made by his sister to the county, the last in his lifetime being a public visit to Shrewsbury and other parts of Shropshire in August 1927.

During that period  Lord Cambridge was considered as a candidate for the then vacant throne of Hungary. He declined the invitation, having treated the idea with some amusement by remarking "Don't you think I would make a nice looking King?"

Death
Lord Cambridge died, aged fifty-nine, after an intestinal operation in October 1927 at a Shrewsbury nursing home, while preparations were being made for another public royal visit to the town (which was consequently cancelled) by his nephew, the Prince of Wales (later King Edward VIII). He was first buried at St George's Chapel and later transferred to the Royal Burial Ground, Frogmore. His elder son, the Earl of Eltham, succeeded him as Marquess of Cambridge.

Titles, styles, honours and arms

Titles and styles
 13 August 1868 – 21 January 1900: His Serene Highness Prince Adolphus of Teck
 21 January 1900 – 9 June 1911: His Serene Highness The Duke of Teck
 9 June 1911 – 14 July 1917: His Highness The Duke of Teck
 14 July 1917 – 7 November 1917: Colonel Sir Adolphus Cambridge
 7 November 1917 – 24 October 1927: The Most Honourable The Marquess of Cambridge

Honours
 :
 KStJ: Knight of Grace of the Most Venerable Order of St John
 KCVO: Knight Commander of the Royal Victorian Order, 30 June 1897
 GCVO: Knight Grand Cross of the Royal Victorian Order, 27 January 1901
 CMG: Companion of the Most Distinguished Order of St Michael and St George
 ADC: Personal Aide-de-Camp, 3 June 1910
 GCB: Knight Grand Cross (civil division) of the Most Honourable Order of the Bath, 19 June 1911
 : Grand Cross of the Order of the Württemberg Crown
  Mecklenburg: Grand Cross of the House Order of the Wendish Crown, with Crown in Ore, 19 July 1902
 : Knight of the Grand Ducal Hessian Order of the Golden Lion, 7 October 1903
   Austria-Hungary:
 Grand Cross of the Imperial Austrian Order of Franz Joseph, 1904
 Knight of the Imperial Order of the Iron Crown, 1st Class, 1908
 : Grand Cordon of the Order of Leopold, 24 February 1916
 : Commander's Cross of the National Order of the Legion of Honour, 9 December 1916

Arms

Ancestry

Family tree

Footnotes

1868 births
1927 deaths
People educated at Wellington College, Berkshire
Graduates of the Royal Military College, Sandhurst
Adolphus
British Army brigadiers
17th Lancers officers
British Life Guards officers
British Army personnel of the Second Boer War
Burials at the Royal Burial Ground, Frogmore
Knights Grand Cross of the Royal Victorian Order
Knights Grand Cross of the Order of the Bath
Companions of the Order of St Michael and St George
Knights of Justice of the Order of St John
Grand Crosses of the Order of Franz Joseph
Commandeurs of the Légion d'honneur
Marquesses of Cambridge
Dukes of Teck
German princes
Residents of White Lodge, Richmond Park
Peers created by George V
Royal reburials